Shebakia or Chebakia, also known as Griwech or Griouech, is a Maghrebi pastry made of strips of dough rolled to resemble a rose, deep-fried until golden, then coated with a syrup made of honey and orange blossom water and sprinkled with sesame. It is typically consumed during Ramadan and religious celebrations. Chebakia is from the Ottoman desserts culture.

Similar pastries include the Cartellate and the Fazuelos, though the latter is constructed differently, and is thinner and less dense.

See also
 List of pastries

References

External links
 
 

Algerian cuisine
Arab cuisine
Moroccan cuisine
Honey dishes